Stephen George "Steve" Benbow (29 November 1931 – 17 November 2006), was a British folk guitar player, singer and music director, who was influential in the English folk music revival of the 1960s. His obituary in The Times described him as "a seminal influence on a whole generation of guitarists".

Early life
He was born in Tooting, Surrey and educated at Reigate Grammar School. On leaving school, despite an aptitude for languages, he took a job on a farm in Axminster, Devon. He did his National Service in the Royal Army Veterinary Corps, and was stationed in the Middle East. There, he learnt the guitar and quickly gained popularity entertaining the troops, including appearances on forces radio where he reportedly sang songs in eight languages.

After completing his stint in the army, he returned to farming but also began working as a part-time musician. He played trad jazz with Dave Kier's jazz band and began accompanying some of the emerging British folk singers such as Ewan MacColl and A. L. Lloyd.

Musical career
His solo recording began in 1957 when he recorded two albums: Steve Benbow Sings English Folk Songs and Steve Benbow sings American Folk Songs. He went on to record over 20 albums. The last, Don't Monkey with My Gun was recorded in 2003.

He was a successful broadcaster, especially during the 1950s, appearing on Guitar Club, Saturday Skiffle Club and Easy Beat. He also hosted a show on Radio Luxembourg in the 1960s.

He collaborated with Spike Milligan on a West End stage show and a television series Muses with Milligan.

He worked as a producer with Dominic Behan and Christy Moore: he was, for example, credited as arranger and musical director of Moore's 1969 album Paddy on the Road. Throughout his career he worked with a wide range of musicians, including Alan Lomax, Robin Hall and Jimmie Macgregor, Pete and Peggy Seeger, Denny Wright, Alex Campbell, Martin Carthy, Cy Grant, Michael Holliday, Rolf Harris, Long John Baldry and Don Partridge. He is credited with being an early influence on Davey Graham and Wizz Jones.

Later years
In later years, he worked as a London cabbie, but continued to appear at folk clubs. He also retained his affinity with domestic animals, keeping goats and a donkey at his home in Hanwell. He maintained a traditional London trolley and was often seen navigating suburban streets in this donkey-drawn cart.
Steve Benbow was still playing in pubs around Brentford, Isleworth and Hounslow until the Friday before his death.

Personal life
He was married twice, having a son and a daughter by his first marriage.

Discography
1957 Steve Benbow Sings English Folk Songs
1957 Steve Benbow Sings American Folk Songs
1958 Sinful Songs
1959 Steve Benbow's Folk Four
1959 Mixed Bag
1960 A Jug of Punch
1960 Rocket Along
1960 A Pinch of Salt
1960 The Hermit & The Mole Catcher And Other Songs
1961 Ballad of Little Musgrave
1962 Steve Benbow Sings Admiral Benbow
1963 I Travel The World
1964 Steve Benbow Tells About This That and the Other
1965 Irish Songs
1965 Journey into The Sun
1966 Songs of Ireland (with The Strawberry Hill Boys) (Monitor Records)
1967 Of Situations And Predicaments
1970 Little Drummer Boy
1970 Next Time Round
1970 Little Red Donkey
1971 Steve Benbow Sings Irish Songs
1971 Steve Benbow With Denny Wright
1972 Friendly Folk
1977 Steve Benbow Sings Irish And Other Songs
2003 Don't Monkey with My Gun

References

External links
 
 Songs of Ireland Album Details at Smithsonian Folkways

British folk guitarists
British male guitarists
People educated at Reigate Grammar School
1931 births
2006 deaths
Royal Army Veterinary Corps soldiers
20th-century British guitarists
20th-century British male musicians
20th-century British musicians